Kalush is a city set in the foothills of the Carpathian Mountains, in Ivano-Frankivsk Oblast (province) of western Ukraine. It is the administrative centre of Kalush Raion (district) and hosts the administration of Kalush urban hromada, one of the hromadas of Ukraine. Its estimated population  was 

Important local industries include chemicals and concrete.

Geography
Kalush is in the western portion of Ivano-Frankivsk Oblast, in the region of Western Ukraine at the foothills of the Carpathian Mountains. It stands on the Dniester tributary, the Limnytsia River that begins from the slopes of the Carpathians. The city is at the eastern borders of the ethnographical region of Boyko Land.

History

The earliest known mention of Kalush is the accounting of a village of that name in a chronicle dated May 27, 1437. At that time, together with all Red Ruthenia, the village belonged to the Kingdom of Poland, and was known under its Polish name, Kałusz. Until the mid-16th century, Kałusz was part of Halicz Land, Ruthenian Voivodeship. It was known for producing malt, its brewery and salt mining. In 1469, King Kazimierz Jagiellonczyk founded a Roman Catholic parish church there.

In 1549 Kalush was incorporated as a city by Crown Hetman Mikołaj Sieniawski on the authority of the Polish Crown (Magdeburg rights). Already then Kalush became also known as a city of chemical industry specializing in producing nitrate. The contemporary city coat of arms derived from the Leliwa coat of arms of the Sieniawski family and is dedicated to the victory in the Battle of Vienna, while the upper portion of the shield contains three white salt furnaces. In 1595 Kalush, which had 55 houses, was ransacked by Crimean Tatars. Here, two important battles took place. In 1672, forces of Hetman Jan Sobieski clashed with Tatars of Selim I Giray, and three years later, Andrzej Potocki fought here with Turks. In 1772, following the Partitions of Poland, the town was seized by the Habsburg Empire, where it remained until 1918.

In 1912–13 prior to World War I near the city of Kalush an oil rig was built. However instead of oil, the rig ended up extracting a natural gas. For long time the gas was not utilized, but later was used for heating a potassium quarry and boilers in Boryslav and Drohobych.

In the Second Polish Republic, Kalush/Kalusz was the seat of a county in Stanislawow Voivodeship. Its population was 15,000, almost equal proportions of Poles, Ukrainians and Jews. Following the 1939 Invasion of Poland, the town was annexed by the Soviet Union. Occupied by the Third Reich from 2 July 1941 until 30 July 1944, it returned to the Soviet Union in 1944. During World War II the residents of the city witnessed many ethnocides. In 1940, the Soviets forced inhabitants of Kalush to leave the town and forcefully moved them to Siberia, many of whom were people of various nationalities: Poles, Ukrainians and others. Then, in late 1941 and 1942, majority of Kalush's Jewish inhabitants were murdered by the Germans. Since the 16th century, a Jewish community had flourished in the city and at times constituted a majority of its population; however, in 1941, while under Nazi control, that community was virtually eliminated. Polish Home Army (AK) was active in the town and its area. The town itself was captured by the AK in mid-July 1944, during the Operation Tempest. In 1945, Polish residents of Kalush were expelled to the Recovered Territories.

On March 20, 1972, the city of Kalush became a city of regional importance.

Recently several renovations have taken place of several local temples such as the Temple of All Saints of the Ukrainian Orthodox Church (Kyiv Patriarchate), the Catholic Saint Valentine Church, and the Ukrainian Greek-Catholic Church of Saint Nicholas.

Until 18 July 2020, Kalush was incorporated as a city of oblast significance and served as the administrative center of Kalush Raion though it did not belong to the raion. In July 2020, as part of the administrative reform of Ukraine, which reduced the number of raions of Ivano-Frankivsk Oblast to six, the city of Kalush was merged into Kalush Raion.

Kalush city council in 2010
Note: Percentage indicates correlation to the total number of seats in the city council which is 50. The results of election were taken from kalush.net where they were published on 4 November 2010. Election was half and half, one (25 seats) by the "majority rule", another (25 seats) – by "party-list". There were 15 non-affiliated members, all of which associated themselves with the Ukrainian Party (2006).

Points of interest

The city still contains an old rathaus which declared as the National Landmark of Architecture #591. The previous rathaus was destroyed during the Khmelnytsky Uprising. The new rathaus served as a town hall and a directory of agriculture since the 20th century. The conditions of the landmark in 2010 were terrible and the rathaus required some major renovations. A fire broke out ruins of the rathaus in 2013.

In the city there is a mount Vysochanka named after a colonel of Lysyanka Regiment during the Cossack Hetmanate and a leader of local uprising in 1648 Semen Vysochan.

Gallery

Notable residents

Stepan Bandera
August Aleksander Czartoryski
Jakub Sobieski
Jan "Sobiepan" Zamoyski
Tomasz Zamoyski
Fedir Danylak
Vlad DeBriansky
Natalie Papazoglu
Oleh Psiuk
Yuriy Izdryk
M. Lincoln Schuster

Aryeh Leib HaCohen Heller, Prominent Rabbi and author of the "Ketzos Hachoshen"
Yehuda Heller Kahana, Prominent Rabbi and author of the "Kuntras HaSfeikos"
Kalush, rap group, winners of the Eurovision Song Contest 2022

Twin towns – sister cities

Kalush is twinned with: 
 Bačka Palanka, Serbia
 Český Krumlov, Czech Republic
 Grand Prairie, United States

Location
Local orientation

Regional orientation

References

External links
 СТАРИЙ КАЛУШ
 Pre-WWII Jewish History in Kalush
 Helpful Kalush website
 Photographs of Jewish sites in Kalush in Jewish History in Galicia and Bukovina
 Website of the Ukrainian Party

 
Cities in Ivano-Frankivsk Oblast
Stanisławów Voivodeship
Shtetls
Cities of regional significance in Ukraine
Holocaust locations in Ukraine